Eldol is a legendary king of Britain in Geoffrey of Monmouth's c. 1136 work Historia Regum Britanniae ("The History of the Kings of Britain").

A 6th century hero called Eidol is mentioned in The Gododdin but is unlikely to be the source for Geoffrey's Eldol. He should also not be confused with Eldol, Consul of Gloucester who lives generations later in Geoffrey's work.

References

Legendary British kings